James Costigan (March 31, 1926 – December 19, 2007) was an American television actor and Emmy Award-winning television screenwriter. His writing credits include the television movies Eleanor and Franklin and Love Among the Ruins.

Early life
Costigan was born on March 31, 1926 in East Los Angeles, where his parents owned and operated a hardware store. He first achieved some level of success in the 1950s, when he came to write for television anthology series, such as Studio One and Kraft Television Theatre.

Career
Costigan won his first Emmy for original teleplay in 1959 for Little Moon of Alban, a segment which appeared as part of the Hallmark Hall of Fame. He earned a second Emmy nomination in 1959 for his script adaptation of The Turn of the Screw. He did not win, but Ingrid Bergman won an Emmy for her performance in The Turn of the Screw. He increasingly began writing for the stage as the format of television began to change. His Broadway credits included Baby Want a Kiss, a 1964 comedy which starred Joanne Woodward and Paul Newman.

He returned to screenwriting for television in the early 1970s. His 1970s work included A War of Children, written in 1972, which was about two families, one Roman Catholic and one Protestant, in Northern Ireland, whose long time friendship is threatened by sectarian violence.

He won a second Emmy Award for Love Among the Ruins, a 1975 television movie set in Edwardian England, which starred Katharine Hepburn and Laurence Olivier. His third Emmy win was for Eleanor and Franklin (1976), a two-part, four-hour television drama focusing on the lives of Franklin and Eleanor Roosevelt.

Death
James Costigan died on December 19, 2007, aged 81, at his home in Bainbridge Island, Washington of heart failure.

References

External links
 
New York Times: James Costigan, Writer of Prestige TV, Is Dead, nytimes.com, January 5, 2008.
 Los Angeles Times:James Costigan, 81; won Emmys for writing TV movies, latimes.com; accessed October 26, 2016.

1926 births
2007 deaths
American television writers
American male television writers
American male television actors
Male actors from Los Angeles
Emmy Award winners
Writers from Los Angeles
Screenwriters from California
20th-century American male actors
20th-century American screenwriters
20th-century American male writers